Nandail is an upazila of Mymensingh District  in the division of Mymensingh, Bangladesh, and roughly 46 kilometers from Mymensingh City.

History
During the rule of Alauddin Husain Shah, Muazzamabad (currently, Muazzampur) was the administrative headquarters of East Bengal. The British established Neel Kuthi (Indigo center) in the 18th century at the Razbari Bazaar of Nandail, and the indigo revolt started in the area.

In the [[East Pakistan -west Pakistani War Nandail suffered huge losses. On 21 April, the Pakistan army killed 18 people and burned a few hundred houses in the Rajgati, Shuvokhila, and Kaliganj areas. On 17 November, a total of 27 freedom fighters including Illias Uddin Bhuiyan, Shamsul Haque, Zillul Baki, Thana Awami, and Shahnewaz Bhuiyan were killed in a battle with Pakistan. This day is observed as the Nandail Shaheed Day.

Geography
It has 62,533 households and a total area of 326.13 km2. It is bounded by Ishwarganj Upazila to the north, Hossainpur and Kishoreganj Sadar Upazilas to the south, Kendua and Tarail Upazilas to the east, Trishal and Gaffargaon Upazilas to the west. The old Brahmaputra and Narasunda rivers are almost gone; and noted depressions are Talar Kur, Zilla Beel, Hamai Beel, Aralia Beel, Balda Beel, Bapail beel and Tongi Beel.

Demographics
According to the 2011 Bangladesh census, Nandail had a population of 402,727. Males constituted 49.21% of the population and females 50.79%. Muslims formed 98.04% of the population, Hindus 1.87% and others 0.09%. Nandail had a literacy rate of 40.38% for the population 7 years and above.

As of the 1991 Bangladesh census, Nandail had a population of 328,847. Males constituted 50.82% of the population, and females 49.18%. The upazila had a population of 155,930 aged 18 or over. Nandail had an average literacy rate of 22.3% (7+ years), compared to a national average of 32.4%.

Economy
Nandail upazila has an agrarian-based economy. The dominant occupations (by percentage) are:

 Agriculture: 50.14%
 Forestry and fishing: 1.03% 
 Agricultural labourer: 16.9%
 Wage labourer: 1.82%
 Commerce: 6.19%
 Services: 6.43%
 Other: 7.49%

The land is divided into cultivable and fallow land. Jute, paddy, wheat, potato, gourd, and aubergine are the main crops. There are few flour and textile mills, and other industries include cottage industries, weaving, bamboo work, blacksmiths, goldsmiths, potteries, tailoring, welding, and wood work.

Administration
Nandail upazila was established on 15 December 1982.

Nandail Upazila is divided into Nandail Municipality and 12 union parishads: Achargaon, Batagoir, Chandipasha, Gangail, Jahangirpur, Kharua, Muajjempur, Mushulli, Nandail, Rajgati, Sherpur, and Singroil. The union parishads are subdivided into 163 mauzas and 265 villages.

Nandail Municipality is subdivided into 9 wards and 20 mahallas.

The area of the Pouroshova is 13.05 km2. It has a population of 28,045 - male 50.34%, female 49.66%. The population density is 2149 per km2. The literacy rate among the town is 37.5%.

Education 

There are 5 colleges, 1 government high school, 35 non-government high schools, 241 madrasas, 115 government primary schools and 63 non-government primary schools. Noted educational institutions: Chandipasha Government High School (1915), which was established by Qazi Nawab Ali. The school had notable students like Justice Shahabuddin Ahmed, the former President of the Republic of Bangladesh, Khaleque Nawaz Khan,the veteran student leader and politician of [[Bangladesh Chhatra League], Kazi Sarwar Hossain (Former  Ambassador and Rear Admiral), Brigadier (Retd.) Dr. Kazi Delwar Hossain, Ershadul Karim Arman, Advocate, Supreme Court of Bangladesh. Shaheed Smriti Adarsha College is also a notable institution which was established by former Governor of Mymensingh District, Rafique Uddin Bhuiyan.

High schools
Currently, there are 36 high schools in Nandail upazila. Here are some of the best known ones:
Bahadurpur High School.
Abdul Hossain High School.
Chandipasha Government High School.
Imam Hossain High School.
Dewanganj Islamia High School.
Nandail Pilot High School.
Archargaon Higher Secondary Schools.
Haji Safir Uddin High School.

Notable people
Nurul Amin (1893–1974), 8th Prime Minister of Pakistan
Aasha Mehreen Amin, former head of The Daily Star editorial team
Shahid Akhand (born 1935), novelist 
Rafiq Uddin Bhuiyan (1928–1996), language activist and politician
Jamal Bhuyan (born 1990), captain of the Bangladesh national football team
Anwarul Hossain Khan Chowdhury, founding member of the Bangladesh Nationalist Party
Khurram Khan Chowdhury (1946–2021), founding member of the Jatiya Party
Kudratullah Mandal, parliamentarian
Anwarul Abedin Khan, former politician
Khaleque Nawaz Khan (1926–1971), founding secretary-general of the Chhatra League
Zahurul Islam Khan, Bikalpa Dhara politician
Abdus Salam (born 1942), retired major general

See also 
Upazilas of Bangladesh.
Districts of Bangladesh.
Divisions of Bangladesh.

References

Upazilas of Mymensingh District